Vicetia may refer to:

Vicetia, a former name for the Italian city of Vicenza
Vicetia (gastropod), a genus of molluscs in the family Cypraeidae